Church of the Apostles may refer to:

Movements 
Christianity of the Apostolic Age
Any Apostolic see, any episcopal see whose foundation is attributed to one or more of the apostles of Jesus

Buildings 
Church of Zion, Jerusalem, also known as the Church of the (Holy) Apostles on Mount Zion, are the remains of a Roman-era church in Jerusalem
Church of the Apostles (Atlanta), an evangelical Anglican congregation in the Buckhead neighborhood of Atlanta, Georgia
Cathedral Church of the Apostles, the cathedral of the ACNA Diocese of the Carolinas in Columbia, South Carolina
Church of the Apostles, Launceston, a Catholic church in Launceston, Tasmania
Monastery of the Holy Apostles in Capernaum, colloquially known as the Church of the Apostles

See also 
Church of the Holy Apostles (disambiguation)

Christian terminology